"And the Grass Won't Pay No Mind" is a song written by Neil Diamond and recorded in 1969 on his Brother Love's Travelling Salvation Show LP. It was also featured on his live LP Hot August Night.  Diamond's original became a minor hit in Australia before the song became a U.S. and Canadian hit for Mark Lindsay in the fall of 1970.

Mark Lindsay version
Mark Lindsay, of Paul Revere and the Raiders fame, recorded "And the Grass Won't Pay No Mind" on his 1970 Silverbird LP. It reached #44 on the U.S. Billboard Hot 100 and #34 in Canada. It was a bigger Easy Listening hit, reaching the Top 20 in both nations (U.S. #5).

Chart history
Neil Diamond

Mark Lindsay

Other versions
 "And the Grass Won't Pay No Mind" was recorded by Elvis Presley on February 17, 1969.  It was included on his If I Can Dream and Back in Memphis LPs. 
 Billy J. Kramer released it as a non-album single for European issue in 1971.

References

External links
 Lyrics of this song
 
 
 

 
 

1969 songs
1970 singles
Songs written by Neil Diamond
Neil Diamond songs
Elvis Presley songs
Mark Lindsay songs
Song recordings produced by Jerry Fuller
Columbia Records singles
MCA Records singles
Song recordings produced by Tom Catalano